Eska may refer to:

Eska (band) 1990s Glasgow band
Eska (singer) 2010s singer
Eska (album), her debut album
Eska TV
Eska Rock
Radio Eska, Polish radio station
Eska Awards
Joseph F. Eska, linguist Lepontic language